The 1994 Torneo Internazional Femmin di Palermo was a women's tennis tournament played on outdoor clay courts at the Country Time Club in Palermo, Italy that was part of the Tier IV category of the 1994 WTA Tour. It was the seventh edition of the tournament and was held from 5 July until 10 July 1994. Second-seeded Irina Spîrlea won the singles title and earned $18,000 first-prize money.

Finals

Singles
 Irina Spîrlea defeated  Brenda Schultz 6–4, 1–6, 7–6(7–5)
 It was Spîrlea's 1st singles title of her career.

Doubles

 Ruxandra Dragomir /  Laura Garrone defeated  Alice Canepa /  Giulia Casoni 6–1, 6–0

References

External links
 ITF tournament edition details
 Tournament draws

Internazionali Femminili di Palermo
Internazionali Femminili di Palermo
1994 in Italian women's sport
Torneo